Around the World in 80 Days was an attraction in the Talbot Street (now David Walliams World) area of Alton Towers theme park, Staffordshire, England. The attraction opened around 1981 or 1982, one or two years after the park first opened. It was the first dark ride at Alton Towers, one of the largest in the UK at the time, and was produced by Keith Sparks for the park's owner John Broome.

It was a 4-minute boat ride which followed the adventures of Phileas Fogg and was loosely based on Jules Verne's 1873 novel Around the World in Eighty Days and took riders through various different countries from around the world. Each boat could hold 9 people and there were 10 boats with 1,000 guests an hour. Each country had its own music and some animated characters. You could travel through London, Siam, Egypt, New York City, Venice, Greenland, Las Vegas, Vienna, Holland, Brazil, Paris, London Docks and Battersea. The ride station was themed around the London docks and featured an animated Phileas Fogg in a hot air balloon. Guests would board from the right hand side and exit on their left.

In 1991, at the end of the ride, was a model of the haunted house's facade, advertising the opening of the attraction in 1992.

The ride was popular in its time, but was closed in 1993 and received a complete overhaul after the Tussauds Group took over Alton Towers. The ride was replaced by Toyland Tours in 1994 and then Charlie and the Chocolate Factory: The Ride in 2006. The ride track and boats stayed much the same but with all new scenes.

In 2019, the ride system was reused once again as part of the Alton Towers Dungeon.

References

External links
Full on-ride recording
Around the World in 80 Days at Alton Towers Almanac

Dark rides
1981 establishments in England
1993 disestablishments in England
Works based on Around the World in Eighty Days
Water rides manufactured by Mack Rides
Water rides
Alton Towers
Amusement rides based on works by Jules Verne